"Big Time" is a song by English rock musician Peter Gabriel from his 1986 album So. It was his second top-ten single on the Billboard Hot 100, peaking at no. 8.

Recording
The song underwent a lot of changes: Jerry Marotta remembers an early version of "Big Time", which he described as more intense and so far out from the released version that it "would not have been a hit."

The song's bass guitar part is unique in that backing bassist Tony Levin and then-backing drummer Jerry Marotta teamed up to record it. Levin handled the fingerings while Marotta hit the strings with his drumsticks, resulting in a percussive sound; it was inspired by a technique developed by Gene Krupa in the 1940s or early 1950s. Inspired by this sound, Levin later invented funk fingers, which were little drumstick ends that could be attached to the fingers to achieve a similar bass guitar effect in concert.

The drum parts were a considerable challenge to record, with Marotta, Manu Katché and Stewart Copeland each playing a take over a click track from the LinnDrum. Gabriel liked Copeland's drum take but felt that it did not quite lock in rhythmically. He said, "I love Stewart's playing. He's not the world's best timekeeper, as he would be first to admit, but he can drive a track like very few others; it's always ahead of the beat, sits right up and forward, and his kit always sounds very alive."

To get around the problem, engineer Kevin Killen mixed down Copeland's drum parts to mono, sampling sections of his playing that lined up best with the click track and flew them in a few bars at a time. Gabriel additionally wanted to bring in the drum fills, which were also meticulously sampled, and adjustments were done to the speed to get them to line up with the track.

Reception
Cash Box said that the song "features Gabriel in a characteristic lyrical goldmine delivering a passionate, believable vocal."  Billboard called it a "dynamic, big-room funk-rocker" that recreates the old Memphis sound.

Music video
The visual style was very similar to the "Sledgehammer" video, using stop motion claymation by David Daniels and strata-cut animation. The larger video was supervised by director Stephen R. Johnson and produced by Prudence Fenton. It was shot at Peter Wallach Studios. Artist Wayne White contributed to the creation of the video.

Track listing
7" UK
Big Time (7" edit)
Curtains

12" UK
Big Time (extended version)
Big Time (7" edit)
Curtains

Cassette single UK
Big Time (extended version)
Curtains
No Self Control (live version)
Across the River

7" USA
Big Time
We Do What We're Told

12" USA
Big Time (dance mix)
In Your Eyes (special mix)
We Do What We're Told

Remixes
Along with the two mixes found on different versions of the single, Big Time has been officially remixed by Electrokingdom in various mixes, including the version by Frenk DJ & Niky D. Although reputed to be more numerous, four mixes (Main Mix - Club Mix - Dub Mix - Acoustic Mix) can be downloaded on legal platforms.

Personnel
Credits adapted from the album So:

Peter Gabriel – vocals, CMI, Prophet, Linn
Stewart Copeland – drums
Simon Clark – Hammond, CMI, bass
Tony Levin, Jerry Marotta – drumstick bass
David Rhodes – guitar
Daniel Lanois – surf guitar
Jimmy Bralower – Linn kick
Wayne Jackson – trumpet, cornet
Mark Rivera – alto, tenor and baritone saxophone
Don Mikkelsen – trombone
P. P. Arnold, Coral Gordon, Dee Lewis – backing vocals

Chart performance

Weekly charts

Year-end charts

In popular culture
"Big Time" was used in 2006 by WWE as the main theme for WrestleMania 22.
It is featured in the intro of the documentary Inside Job.

The B-Side, "Curtains," was not released in digital format until 2004, when the 'Broad Mix' of the song was featured in the videogame Myst IV: Revelation, to which Peter Gabriel also lent his voice as an actor.

References

External links

1986 songs
1987 singles
Animated music videos
Dance-rock songs
Funk rock songs
Geffen Records singles
Peter Gabriel songs
Song recordings produced by Daniel Lanois
Songs about fame
Songs written by Peter Gabriel
Virgin Records singles
Music videos directed by Stephen R. Johnson